Evergreen Lutheran High School (commonly shortened to "Evergreen") is a private secondary school owned and operated by the Pacific Northwest Lutheran High School Association. It is affiliated with the Wisconsin Evangelical Lutheran Synod and Evangelical Lutheran Synod (WELS and ELS), and is located in Tacoma, Washington. Evergreen Lutheran High School is supported by The Evergreen Lutheran School System (TELSS) which comprises Evangelical Lutheran Synod (ELS) and Wisconsin Evangelical Lutheran Synod (WELS) churches and primary schools in the Puget Sound and Pacific Northwest area.

The school's sports teams are referred to as the Evergreen Eagles. The school is attended by teen members of area WELS churches, as well as international students from South Korea, China, Hong Kong, India, and Japan.

Athletics
The Evergreen Eagles participate in the Washington Interscholastic Activities Association Sea-King District 2, Sea-Tac 1B league. The school has won the WIAA Scholastic Cup for exceptional athletic and academic achievement twice. In the Fall, the school offers Girls and Boys Soccer teams, a Boys Football team, and a Girls Volleyball team. In the winter, they have Boys and Girls Basketball, and Cheerleading/Dance. In the Spring, they have Boys Baseball, Girls Softball, and a Track and Field team. In 2007 the school launched its first Boys Football program.

Academics
Evergreen Lutheran offers one AP course, AP United States History course, which prepares students for the Advanced Placement Program tests.

Extracurricular activities
Evergreen students have many opportunities for extracurricular activities.  These include choir, band, drama, knowledge bowl, and student council.

Campus facilities
Evergreen Lutheran was started in 1978 at its first campus in DuPont, Washington before the lease expired the summer of 1991. Evergreen then rented facilities from Holy Trinity Lutheran Church in Des Moines, Washington from September 1991 until July 2013 during which time classes were held in portables, outbuildings, gymnasium, and rented classrooms. After over 25 years of unsuccessful attempts to locate and purchase a permanent facility, Evergreen successfully purchased a 30-acre campus with a modern 54,000 square foot school that was built in 2005 on December 18, 2012.  This campus is located at the corner of Waller Rd and 72nd Street East in Tacoma, WA. The campus was purchased from the Lutheran Church Extension Fund (LCEF) and was previously occupied by Mount Rainier Lutheran High School. Evergreen moved into the new campus building on July 20, 2013 and on September 9, 2013 Evergreen held the first day of classes of their 36th school year at the new facility. The property is designed with the ability to accommodate the development of future athletic fields and dormitory space.

References

External links
 School Website

High schools in King County, Washington
Private high schools in Washington (state)
Lutheran schools in Washington (state)
Educational institutions established in 1978
1978 establishments in Washington (state)
Secondary schools affiliated with the Wisconsin Evangelical Lutheran Synod
Evangelical Lutheran Church in America schools